The year 1826 in architecture involved some significant architectural events and new buildings.

Buildings and structures

Buildings opened
 January 30 – The Menai Suspension Bridge over the Menai Strait in Wales, designed by Thomas Telford.
 December 17 – Helsinki Old Church, designed by Carl Ludvig Engel.

Buildings completed

 Cathedral of Chihuahua, Mexico.
 The Bank of England in London, designed by Sir John Soane.
 Cumberland Terrace in London, designed by John Nash and John Thompson.
 Alexander Nevsky Memorial Church in Potsdam, a very early example of Byzantine Revival architecture designed by Vasily Stasov.
 Stadttempel, Vienna, Austria.
 Sofienbad, Vienna, Austria.

Awards
 Grand Prix de Rome – Léon Vaudoyer

Births
 April 11 – Thomas Worthington, English architect based in Manchester (died 1909)
 July 18 – Edward Habershon, English architect (died 1900)
 August 2 — Thomas Alexander Tefft, American architect based in Providence, Rhode Island (died 1859)
 August 16 – Thomas Seaton Scott, Canadian architect (died 1895)

Deaths
 March 1 – Friedrich Weinbrenner, German architect and city planner (born 1766)
 July 4 – Thomas Jefferson, American polymath and neoclassical architect (born 1743)

References

Architecture
Years in architecture
19th-century architecture